James Tilley may refer to:

 James Tilley (rugby league) (born 1993), Jamaican rugby league footballer
 James Tilley (footballer) (born 1998), English footballer for Crawley Town
 James Tilley (political scientist), professor of politics

See also
 Jim Tilley (born 1950), Canadian-born American poet